Hurstville City Minotaurs is a semi-professional Australian association football club based in Hurstville, New South Wales.

History
Hurstville City Minotaurs Soccer Club was established in 1985 by Greeks in Sydney. Specifically Greeks who trace their roots back to the island of Crete. The club traditionally plays in a black and white striped jersey design.

In the early years, the Cretan Association were annual financial supporters of the club. Since this ceased, the Minotaurs have continued to exist with support from various private sponsors.

Current squad

Updated June 2019

Honours
First Grade
1991 – NSW 7th Division Champions
1992 – NSW 2nd Division Runners Up
1994 – NSW 2nd Division Champions
1995 – NSW 1st Division Runners Up
1997 – NSW 1st Division Minor Premiers
1998 – NSW 1st Division Runners Up
2007 – NSW 2nd Division Minor Premiers and Champions
2010 – NSW 2nd Division Runners Up
2020 – St George Premier League 2 Minor Premiers 
2022 – St George Premier League 2 Minor Premiers & Champions 

Reserve Grade
2020 – St George Premier League 2 Minor Premiers & Champions 
2022 – St George Premier League 2 Minor Premiers & Champions 

Club Championships
2020 – St George Premier League 2 Club Champions
2022 – St George Premier League 2 Club Champions

Over 45s 'Legends'
St George Football Association O4s
2015 – St George Football Association Minor Premiers & Champions
2016 – St George Football Association Minor Premiers & Champions
2017 – St George Football Association Minor Premiers & Champions
2018 – St George Football Association Minor Premiers & Champions
2019 – St George Football Association Minor Premiers & Champions
2020 – St George Football Association Minor Premiers & Champions
2021 – St George Football Association Minor Premiers (No Finals series)
2022 – St George Football Association Minor Premiers & Champions

Football NSW Champions of Champions 
2016 – Champions
2018 – Champions
2019 – Champions
2022 – Champions

External links
 Club Website

Soccer clubs in New South Wales
Association football clubs established in 1985
1985 establishments in Australia
Diaspora sports clubs in Australia